Kalateh-ye Sufi (also Romanized as Kalāteh-ye Şūfī) is a village in Bala Jam Rural District, Nasrabad District, Torbat-e Jam County, Razavi Khorasan Province, Iran. At the 2006 census, its population was 1,242, in 253 families.

References 

Populated places in Torbat-e Jam County